The European Movement International is a lobbying association that coordinates the efforts of associations and national councils with the goal of promoting European integration, and disseminating information about it.

History
The origins of the European Movement date to July 1947, when the cause of a united Europe was being promoted by Duncan Sandys in the form of the Anglo-French United European Movement (UEM). The UEM acted as a platform for the co-ordination of the organisations created in the wake of World War II. As a result of their efforts, the congress of The Committee for the Co-ordination of the European Movements took place in Paris on 17 July 1947 incorporating "La Ligue Européenne de Coopération Economique" (LECE), "l'Union Européenne des Fédéralistes" (UEF), "l'Union Parlementaire Européenne" (UPE) and the Anglo-French United European Movements. They met again on 10 November 1947 and changed their name to The Joint International Committee for European Unity. They retained this name until after the 1948 Congress of The Hague.

From 7 to 11 May 1948, 800 delegates from Europe and observers from Canada and the United States gathered in The Hague, the Netherlands for the Congress of Europe. Organised by the International Committee of the Movements for European Unity and presided over by Winston Churchill, the Congress discussed ideas about the development of the European Union. Politicians such as Konrad Adenauer, Winston Churchill, Harold Macmillan, Bertrand Russell, François Mitterrand, Paul-Henri Spaak, Albert Coppé and Altiero Spinelli took an active role in the congress and a call was launched for a political, economic and monetary Union of Europe. This conference had a profound influence on the shape of the European Movement, which was created soon afterwards.

The European Movement was formally created on 25 October 1948, when the Joint International Committee for European Unity decided to change its name. Duncan Sandys was elected President and Léon Blum, Winston Churchill, Alcide De Gasperi and Paul-Henri Spaak were elected as Honorary Presidents. The U.S. policy was to promote a United States of Europe, and to this end the American Committee on United Europe committee was used to discreetly funnel CIA funds to such organisations as this.

Initially the European Movement in the 1940s brought together "federalists and European unionists".  The federalists, organised mainly in the European Union of Federalists, sought "an abatement of national sovereignty" whilst the unionists aimed "at creating an association of states as close as is compatible with the retention of national sovereign independence."

In May 1949, the European Movement played a significant role in encouraging ten European states to create the Council of Europe, and to begin work on drafting a charter of rights, which eventually became the European Convention on Human Rights. The European Movement was also responsible for the creation of the College of Europe in Bruges and the European Center of Culture in Geneva. One of its major functions during the 1950s through to the 1990s was the setting up of think-tanks and a network of discussion groups across Europe, in countries both democratic and Communist.

Since 1948, the European Movement has lobbied for further integration, on numerous subjects. It worked in favour of the direct election of the European Parliament by all European citizens, in favour of the Treaty on the European Union (the Maastricht Treaty) and also for a European Constitution.

Presidents

Secretaries General

Activities
The Movement's various Councils and Associations, under the co-ordination of the European Movement International (EMI), work to influence European decision-makers - associations, governments, politicians, political parties, enterprises, trade unions and individual lobbyists - to promote European integration.

The EM also works as a study and information group operating through various projects and activities, and publishes information on European affairs and activities.

Organisation
The Movement's central office, located at Place de Luxembourg in Brussels, is headed up by a President and six Vice-Presidents. Honorary Presidents, generally prominent European politicians, are also elected, but hold no executive powers.

The current President of the EMI is Eva Maydell, MEP. The management of the organisation is drawn from across Europe.

International Associations
The EMI has several International Member Associations. These include civil society organisations, business and trade unions, NGOs, political parties, local authorities and academia.

Supporting Members
 College of Europe
 Foundation Euractiv
 The Kosovar Civil Society Foundation - KCSF

National Councils
At national level there are National Councils in 39 countries, organized in a very diverse way. In principle national councils of all countries which are members of the Council of Europe can join the European Movement. Only on national level the EM has youth branches.

Board
Policy is formulated by a Board, the chairmanship of which is held by the President. A 'Federal Assembly', made up of delegates from all member organisations foments policies for the EMI and is in charge of the organisation's Auditors. Several specialist committees, devoted to the discussion of individual policies exist as well. The current Political Committees are: More Democracy, Citizens' Rights and Freedom; Jobs, Competitiveness and Sustainable Growth; and Europe in the World. Day-to-day office-work is performed by the staff, which is led by a Secretary General, who since 2015 has been Petros Fassoulas.

Current Members of the Board are:

President - Eva Maydell; Secretary General - Petros Fassoulas; Vice-presidents - Brando Benifei, Yves Bertoncini, Tobias Köck, Noelle O'Connell, Valeria Ronzitti, Frédéric Vallier; Treasurer - Nataša Owens; Board members - Aku Aarva, Francisco Aldecoa Luzárranga, Antonio Argenziano, Veronika Chmelárová, Marco Cilento, Sina Frank, Monica Frassoni, Patrizia Heidegger, Olivier Hinnekens, Zvezdana Kovač, Roselyne Lefrançois, Richard Morris.

See also
European Integration
European Movement Belgium
European Movement Germany
European Movement Ireland
European Movement UK
European Movement in Scotland (EMiS)
Politics of Europe

References

External links

Official website
Historical fonds of European Movement at the Historical Archives of the EU in Florence

Eurofederalism
Cross-European advocacy groups
Organizations established in 1947